Pentlandia is an extinct genus of prehistoric sarcopterygians or lobe-finned fish.
Its first discovered species was initially named Dipterus macroptera by Ramsay Traquair in 1888, then
renamed Pentlandia macroptera by D.M.S. Watson and H. Day in 1916.

See also

 Sarcopterygii
 List of sarcopterygians
 List of prehistoric bony fish

References

Prehistoric lobe-finned fish genera